Adobe Rock is described by the USGS as a pediment (geology) at Lake Point, Utah. The large rock outcropping sits adjacent to SR-36 just north of SR-138 at Mills Junction. Because of its distance from the steep incline of the Oquirrh Mountains and its prominent location on the edge of a hill, Adobe Rock has served as a natural landmark in Tooele Valley ever since the first pioneers traversed the Hastings Cutoff trail. Though not officially a national monument like its nearby peer Black Rock (Great Salt Lake), it has equal significance as a navigating landmark and cultural significance as a monument with businesses using the Adobe Rock name, books using its images on their covers, and Lake Point, Utah depicting its likeness as their city logo.

History

On July 27, 1947, The Daughters of Utah Pioneers installed a Utah Historical Marker on the west side of Adobe Rock to designate it as a historical monument in Tooele County, Utah. The marker says it was placed by the Tooele County Company of the Daughters of Utah Pioneers, DUP marker No. 103.

Land Use
Although Adobe Rock makes a major visual impact throughout Tooele Valley, it is completely inaccessible to the public. The land is privately owned by Kennecott Utah Copper LLC and fenced off for use of horse pastures. On October 18, 2018, the Tooele County Planning Commission approved Kennecott's proposed rezoning plan to develop 1,444 acres around Adobe Rock and across SR-36 into a large mixed-use housing development called Adobe Rock Ranch. This plan encompassed adding 4,710 residential units along with a variety of commercial, retail, and open space. Residents who opposed the Adobe Rock Ranch rezoning plan gathered enough signatures to allow a vote to revoke the approval of the county. During the 2020 United States elections a large majority of Tooele County residents voted no on Proposition #2: Adobe Rock Ranch which ended county approval for the Kennecott development plan.

See also

Oquirrh Mountains
Black Rock (Great Salt Lake)
Lake Point, Utah
Stansbury Park

References

External links

Rock formations
Geologic formations